The infrapatellar fat pad (Hoffa's fat pad) is a cylindrical piece of fat that is situated under and behind the patella bone within the knee.

Clinical significance

The fat pad is a normal structure but it can sometimes become a problem:
 It can become damaged and painful
 It can be deliberately removed at arthroscopic surgery to make it easier for the surgeon to see what they are doing - but this can also lead to scarring and pain.
 It can become hypertrophic and may become impinged between the patella and the femoral condyle, causing sharp pain when the leg is extended.  This is called infrapatellar fat pad syndrome or Hoffa syndrome.
 It can become involved in the process of arthrofibrosis and become scarred (fibrotic) and contracted, pulling the patella down into an abnormally low position.

References

Joints